Mariana is the oldest city in the state of Minas Gerais, Brazil. It is a tourist city, founded on July 16, 1696, and retains the characteristics of a baroque city, with its churches, buildings and museums. It was the first capital of Minas Gerais.

Other historical cities in Minas Gerais are Ouro Preto, São João del-Rei, Diamantina, Tiradentes, Congonhas and Sabará.

In 2015, it suffered a major dam disaster.

References

External links

 
Municipalities in Minas Gerais
Populated places established in 1696
1696 establishments in the Portuguese Empire